Michael Langdon CBE (12 November 192012 March 1991) was a British bass opera singer.

Langdon was born in Wolverhampton. He had six half brothers and sisters, the youngest, Maud being 19 years his senior. His father, Harry (birth name Frank Birtles) was sixty when his youngest son was born. He was blind and after he retired from business, his young son spent much time with him, reading to him, sharing walks and conversation and learning to play the piano. Harry died when Frank was ten. Frank promptly failed the 11 plus, to his teacher's amazement. He excelled at the less academic school he attended. He disliked school and was pleased to leave.

He was principal bass at the Royal Opera House from 1951 and sang in most of the great opera houses of the world, most often in the role of Baron Ochs in Der Rosenkavalier during the 1960s and 1970s. His voice has been described as 'basso profundo'. He could reach the lowest noted of that part with ease while going into a falsetto for the highest note in the famous waltz - something he wished he didn't have to do. 

Other operas in which he sang included The Midsummer Marriage, Gloriana, The Olympians, Billy Budd, A Midsummer Night's Dream, Don Carlos, Arabella, Don Pasquale and The Abduction from the Seraglio.

He was founder-director of the National Opera Studio. Lesley Garrett spent a year there during his time. A subarachnoid haemorrhage brought an end to his time there after 10 years. Langdon retired from singing in 1977. His autobiography, Notes From a Low Singer, was published in 1982.

His long association with Covent Garden tempted him out of retirement for one final role; he appeared as the Prison Governor Colonel Frank in the 1984 production of Die Fledermaus.

He was an avid football fan, supporting Wolverhampton Wanderers all his life. Langdon died in Hove in 1991. He was survived by his wife, Vera. He has two daughters, Christine and Diane. His granddaughter is a successful BBC Radio 1 employee.

External links 
Erik Eriksson, Michael Langdon Biography, Allmusic.
Interview with Michael Langdon, 2 June 1981

1920 births
1991 deaths
20th-century British male opera singers
Operatic basses
British basses
English basses
musicians from Wolverhampton
Musicians from Staffordshire
Commanders of the Order of the British Empire